Měnín is a municipality and village in Brno-Country District in the South Moravian Region of the Czech Republic. It has about 1,800 inhabitants.

Notable people
Mojmír Povolný (1921–2012), lawyer and politician
Jaroslav Konečný (1945–2017), handball player

References

Villages in Brno-Country District